Moonflower Murders is a 2020 mystery novel by British author Anthony Horowitz and the second novel in the Susan Ryeland series. The story focuses on the disappearance of a hotel employee and utilizes a story within a story format.

Synopsis
After the events of Magpie Murders Susan Ryeland has been living in Crete with her lover Andreas, running a struggling hotel. She is approached by Lawrence and Pauline Treherne, owners of a hotel in England, because she was the editor of deceased mystery author Alan Conway. Conway used the details of a murder that occurred at the Treherne’s hotel eight years ago in one of his mystery novels, Atticus Pünd  Takes the Case. The Treherne’s daughter Cecily had just recently read the book and called her parents telling them that the book proves that the person in jail for the murder is innocent. Shortly after that phone call Cecily disappears. The Trehernes offer Susan ten thousand pounds to come back to England, stay at their hotel, and use any insight she might have gotten by editing the book to help track down Cecily. Susan, needing the money to help with the struggling hotel, agrees and heads back to England to help.

While at the hotel Susan finds that there are many suspects, as the murder victim Frank Parris was reportedly unpleasant to the point where even his sister actively disliked him. The most prominent suspects are Cecily's husband Aiden, Frank's sister and her husband, and Cecily's sister Lisa. Ultimately Susan uncovers that Aiden killed not only Frank Parris, but also his wife. In his past he had worked as a male prostitute named Leo out of desperation. Frank had frequently hired him to engage in BDSM, taking joy in humiliating Aiden. He had quit working as a prostitute and eventually married Cecily, not out of love but because she was wealthy. When Frank came to the Treherne's hotel he tried to blackmail Aiden, only for the man to murder Frank in order to keep his past a secret. The murder was pinned on a worker with a criminal past while Aiden was able to get away with the crime until many years later, when Cecily discovered a clue in the novel: that the book was dedicated to Frank and Leo. Aware that she'd uncovered his crime and past, Aiden murdered Cecily. When he finds that he's been discovered, Aiden commits suicide by jumping in front of a train.

Atticus Pünd  Takes the Case
In the novel Pünd and his new secretary are hired to investigate the murder of Melissa James, a former actress turned wife and hotel owner. As with the case of Frank Parris, there are many potential killers who could have murdered Melissa such as her husband, a purported lover who was running a Ponzi scheme with her money, and the couple she had hired to run the hotel but who were embezzling money from her. Evidence leads towards her husband, who begins to confess to the crime but is murdered before the police can take him away. Pünd eventually discovers that the true murderer is her doctor, Leonard, who murdered her because she wanted to go public with their affair. Melissa's husband had strangled her in a fit of rage when she confronted him, but had not actually killed her. Before passing out she had called Leonard to report the assault and when he arrived, he had taken the opportunity to finish the job. It's also revealed that the husband had been murdered by Pünd's secretary, who had been a fan of Melissa's work and had killed him in order to seek revenge.

Reception
Moonflower Murders received positive reviews, earning a "Rave" rating from the book review aggregator Book Marks based on six independent reviews. Positive reviews were published in the Washington Post, Publishers Weekly, Kirkus Reviews, and the New York Times.

References

External links
 

2020 British novels
British mystery novels
Novels by Anthony Horowitz
Random House books